Wushi Town may refer to:

Wushi, Xiangtan,  an urban town in Xiangtan County, Xiangtan City, Hunan Province
Wushi, Zixi, an urban town in Zixi County, Fuzhou City, Jiangxi Province